Madawaska-la-Vallée was a provincial electoral district which elected one member to the Legislative Assembly (MLA) of New Brunswick, Canada.  It was created in the 1994 redrawing of electoral boundaries and dissolved in 2006.  It was used in the 1995, 1999 and 2003 elections.  Its only MLA was Progressive Conservative Party of New Brunswick representation Percy Mockler, now a member of the Senate of Canada.

In 1994, the district was created largely by merging the districts of Madawaska Centre and Madawaska South.  In 2006, most of the district was merged with Restigouche West to form Restigouche-la-Vallée.

Members of the Legislative Assembly

Election results

* This was a new riding created largely out of a merger of the former ridings of Madawaska Centre and Madawaska South, the former of which was held by Clavette, a Liberal and the latter of which was held by Mockler, a Progressive Conservative.

External links 
Website of the Legislative Assembly of New Brunswick

Former provincial electoral districts of New Brunswick